Khuthan is a block of Jaunpur District.The Population of Khuthan is 4900. Khuthan is a police station in Shahganj tehsil. It is a market and vegetable Mandi. It was a Vidhan Sabha Constituency till 2012.Sailendra Yadav Lalai was the last MLA of Khuthan.

Villages in Jaunpur district